Magnan is a French surname. Notable people with the surname include:

Antoine Magnan (1881–1938), French zoologist and aeronautical engineer
Bernard Pierre Magnan (1791–1865), Marshal of France
Clothilde Magnan (born 1973), French fencer
Dominique Magnan (1731–1796), French Minim monk
Jean-Claude Magnan (born 1941), French fencer
Marc Magnan (born 1962), Canadian ice hockey player
Octave Magnan (1836–1921), Canadian politician
Olivier Magnan (born 1986), Canadian ice hockey player
Valentin Magnan (1835–1916), French psychiatrist

See also
Magnin, a surname

French-language surnames